Howard Melvin Stevens Jr. (born February 9, 1950, in Harrisonburg, Virginia 
) is a former NFL running back who played for the New Orleans Saints and the Baltimore Colts. He was one of the smallest players to play in the NFL and was the smallest during his 5 years in the league.

College 
Stevens started his college career at Randolph-Macon College, where he was named All-American in 1968 (honorable mention) and 1969 (second-team). On a team that won the Mason–Dixon Conference championship with a 9–0–0 record in his freshman year, he was the league Most Valuable Player as the NCAA College Division leader in scoring and rushing with 142 points and 1,468 yards respectively and was featured in Faces in the Crowd in the January 20, 1969 issue of Sports Illustrated. He transferred to the University of Louisville where he earned a B.A. in Psychology. Stevens played only two seasons for Louisville but has been inducted into the school's athletic hall of fame. In 1972, Stevens was named to the United Press International, the Walter Camp and the Football News all-American football teams and the Associated Press Second-team. The University of Louisville retired Stevens' jersey in 1972. He set a school record for rushing yards in a season with 1,429 yards in 1971 while scoring 12 touchdowns. He is currently ranked fourth all-time in school history with 2,723 rushing yards and is sixth with 25 career touchdowns.

NFL 
He played two years for the Saints, lead the NFL in 1974 in kick-off and punt returns. In 1975, Stevens was picked up by the Baltimore Colts where he was used exclusively as a kick-off and punt returner. During his tenure in the NFL, he was the league's smallest player, rushed for a total of 376 yards on 89 carries and scored 4 touchdowns. As a kick returner he ran for 2336 yards on 103 returns. He returned 163 punts for 1,559 yards. He never returned a kick-off or punt for a touchdown.

Later years 
After leaving the Baltimore Colts, Stevens remained in the Baltimore area. He and his wife Joyce have three adult children.

References 

1950 births
Living people
Baltimore Colts players
New Orleans Saints players
People from Harrisonburg, Virginia
Louisville Cardinals football players
Randolph–Macon Yellow Jackets football players